Shegaftik-e Sofla (also Romanized as Shegaftīk-e Soflá; also known as Ḩājjī Maḩmūd, Chamān, and Shekaftīk-e Soflá) is a village in Beradust Rural District, Sumay-ye Beradust District, Urmia County, West Azerbaijan Province, Iran. At the 2006 census, its population was 231, in 40 families.

References 

Populated places in Urmia County